As a nickname, Mouse or The Mouse may refer to:

People nicknamed Mouse 

 Gordon Cleaver (1910–1994), British Second World War flying ace
 Mouse Davis (born 1932), American football coach and player
 William B. Evans (born 1958), Commissioner of the Boston Police Department
 Edward Fielden (RAF officer) (1903–1976), Royal Air Force air vice-marshal
 Curt Malawsky (born 1970), Canadian former box lacrosse player and current head coach
 Ed Mierkowicz (1924–2017), American former Major League Baseball player
 Mouse Morris (born 1951), Irish racehorse trainer and jockey
 Mouse Randolph (1909–1997), American swing jazz trumpeter
 Micheen Thornycroft (born 1987), Zimbabwean Olympic rower

People nicknamed The Mouse 

 Edgar Munzel (1907–2002), American sportswriter
 Bruce Strauss (born 1952), American retired journeyman boxer
 Daniel Zaragoza (born 1957), Mexican retired boxer

See also 

Hovik Abrahamyan (born 1958), Prime Minister of Armenia nicknamed "Muk" ("Mouse")
Krisztina Egerszegi (born 1974), Hungarian former swimmer nicknamed "Egér" ("Mouse") or "Egérke" ("Little Mouse")
Emerson Fittipaldi (born 1946), semi-retired Brazilian automobile racing driver nicknamed Rato (Portuguese for "mouse")
El Ratón (disambiguation) (Spanish for "The Mouse"), including a list of people (and one bull)
Ginetta Sagan (1925–2000), human rights activist nicknamed "Topolino" ("Little Mouse")
Mighty Mouse (nickname)

Lists of people by nickname